The Three Pirates (Italian: I tre corsari) is a 1952 Italian adventure film directed by  Mario Soldati. It is based on a novel by Emilio Salgari.

Cast
 Ettore Manni: Il Corsaro Nero - Enrico di Ventimiglia 
 Marc Lawrence: Van Gould 
 Barbara Florian: Isabella 
 Renato Salvatori: Il Corsaro Rosso - Rolando di Ventimiglia 
 Cesare Danova: Il Corsaro Verde - Carlo di Ventimiglia 
 Alberto Sorrentino: Agonia 
 Gualtiero Tumiati: Comte di Ventimiglia 
 Ignazio Balsamo: Van Stiller 
 Joop van Hulzen: Vice-roi de S.M. 
 Ubaldo Lay: Il carceriere Alvaro 
 Tiberio Mitri: Jordan Graumont

External links
 

1952 films
1950s Italian-language films
Films directed by Mario Soldati
Films based on The Corsairs of the Antilles
Films set in the 1660s
Italian adventure films
1952 adventure films
Italian black-and-white films
1950s Italian films